Astley is a surname and given name. Notable people with the name include:

Surname
 Amy Astley (born 1969), American magazine editor
 Arthur Astley (1881–1915), British track and field athlete
 Delaval Astley (1868–1951), Scottish curler
 Dai Astley (1909–1989), Welsh footballer
 Edward Astley (disambiguation), multiple people, including:
Sir Edward Astley, 4th Baronet (1729–1802), British MP for Norfolk 
Edward Astley, 22nd Baron Hastings (1912–2007), British peer, soldier and businessman
 Edwin Astley (1922–1998), British composer
 Gordon Astley, British radio presenter
 Graham Astley (born 1957), Australian cricketer
 Horace Astley (born 1882), English footballer
 Hubert Delaval Astley (1860–1925), painter
 Sir Isaac Astley (died 1659), English baronet
 Jack Astley (1909–1984), English football right back
 Jacob Astley (disambiguation), multiple people, including:
Jacob Astley, 1st Baron Astley of Reading (1579–1652), English soldier and royalist
Sir Jacob Astley, 1st Baronet (c. 1639 – 1729), English MP for Norfolk
Jacob Astley, 3rd Baron Astley of Reading (c. 1654 – 1688), English peer
Jacob Astley, 16th Baron Hastings (1797–1859), British MP for West Norfolk 
 Joe Astley (1899–1967), English footballer
 John Astley (disambiguation), multiple people
 Jon Astley, British record producer
 Judy Astley, English author
 Justin Astley (born 1983), English snooker player
 Mark Astley (born 1969), Canadian ice hockey player
 Neil Astley (born 1953), British publisher, editor and writer
 Philip Astley (1742–1814), English circus performer
 Rick Astley (born 1966), British singer
 Robert Astley (born 1944), Chairman of the Canada Pension Plan Investment Board
 Thea Astley (1925–2004), Australian novelist and short story writer
 Thomas Astley (died 1759), English bookseller and publisher
 Virginia Astley (born 1959), English singer-songwriter
 William Astley (1855–1911), Australian short story writer

Given name
 Sir Astley Cooper (1768–1841), English surgeon and anatomist
 Astley Jones, newsreader and continuity announcer
 Sir Astley Cooper Key ( 1821–1888), Royal Navy officer

See also
 Astley baronets

English-language surnames
English toponymic surnames
Surnames of English origin